The Otto River is a short river of the West Coast Region of New Zealand's South Island. It is one of the headwaters of the Grey River.

See also
List of rivers of New Zealand

References

Rivers of the West Coast, New Zealand
Grey District
Rivers of New Zealand